Diligence or Diligent was launched in Spain in 1795 and came into British ownership as a French prize acquired in 1800. She became a slave ship in the triangular trade in enslaved people. She made three complete voyages as a slave ship. During her third voyage she captured three French vessels. She was wrecked in 1804 on her fourth journey before she had embarked any slaves.

Origin and name
Diligence first appeared in Lloyd's Register (LR), and the Register of Shipping (RS), in 1802. Both agreed on the master, owner and trade. However, Lloyd's Register showed her origin as Spain and her launch year as 1795, whereas the Register of Shipping described her as a French prize taken in 1800.

Although the registers used the name Diligence, the Trans-Atlantic Slave Trade database uses the name Diligent, as do most press reports, particularly Lloyd's List.

Career
1st slave voyage (1801–1802): Captain David Marshall acquired a  letter of marque on 2 July 1801. He sailed from Liverpool on 25 July. Diligence arrived at St Vincent on 1 January 1802. She arrived back at Liverpool 16 March 1802. She had left Liverpool with 43 crew members and had suffered two crew deaths on her voyage.

2nd slave voyage (1802–1803):  Captain Marshall sailed from Liverpool on 18 August 1802. He acquired slaves at Bonny and arrived at St Vincent with 329. Diligent arrived back at Liverpool on 3 April 1803. She had left Liverpool with 34 crew members and had suffered two crew deaths on her voyage.

After the resumption of war with France, Captain David Marshall acquired a letter of marque on 23 May 1803.

3rd slave voyage (1803–1804): Captain Marshall sailed from Liverpool on 18 June 1803.

In December 1803, Lloyds List reported that Diligent, Marshall, had captured two Dutch Guineamen, and carried them into Bonny. In January 1804, Lloyd's List reported that Aimable Julie, prize to Diligent, Marshall, master, had arrived at Barbados. Then Lloyd's List reported that Deux Amis, prize to Diligent, Marshall, master, had wrecked on the Bonny Bar. However, Diligent and Oliviere had rescued the crew and slaves and taken them to Barbados. Oliviere too was a prize to Diligent, Marshall, master.

Diligent arrived at Demerara on 17 December 1803 with 329 slaves. She sailed for Liverpool on 16 March 1804 and arrived there on 2 May. She had left Liverpool with 50 crew members and had suffered four crew deaths on her voyage. She returned with a cargo of sugar, coffee, cotton, and six elephant teeth (ivory tusks).

4th slave voyage (1804–loss): Captain John Preston acquired a letter of marque on 13 July 1804. He sailed from Liverpool on 6 August.

Fate
Diligent was lost on 3 October 1804 at Bonny, Nigeria. She was on a voyage from Liverpool to Bonny.

In 1804, 30 British slave ships were lost; eight were lost on the African coast.

Notes

Citations

References
 
 
 
 
 

1795 ships
Ships built in Spain
Captured ships
Age of Sail merchant ships of England
Liverpool slave ships
Maritime incidents in 1804